"I'll Go Crazy" is a song co-written and recorded by American country music artist Andy Griggs.  It was released in July 1999 as the second single from the album You Won't Ever Be Lonely.  The song reached number 10 on the Billboard Hot Country Singles & Tracks chart.  Griggs wrote this song with Zack Turner and Lonnie Wilson.

Chart performance
"I'll Go Crazy" debuted at number 60 on the U.S. Billboard Hot Country Singles & Tracks for the week of July 17, 1999.

Year-end charts

References

1999 singles
Andy Griggs songs
Song recordings produced by David Malloy
RCA Records Nashville singles
Songs written by Zack Turner
1999 songs
Songs written by Andy Griggs
Songs written by Lonnie Wilson